Algeria have appeared in the finals of the Africa Cup of Nations on eighteen occasions. The side's first participation was in 1968 in Ethiopia. Algeria has won the cup twice: the first time was when they hosted the tournament in 1990, and they won a second title in the 2019 edition, held in Egypt. Algeria also finished second in the 1980 edition, held in Nigeria, and third in the 1984 and 1988 editions, held in Ivory Coast and Morocco respectively.

Overall record

By match

Goalscorers

* – Own goal

Squads

References

External links
Africa Cup of Nations - Archives competitions - cafonline.com

 
Algeria national football team
Countries at the Africa Cup of Nations